Gérald Cid (born 17 February 1983) is a French former professional footballer who played primarily as a centre back. He played Ligue 1 football for Bordeaux and Nice, spent a season on loan at Ligue 2 club Istres, and played briefly for English Premier League club Bolton Wanderers. He represented both Bordeaux and Bolton in European competition.

Career
Cid was born in Talence, Gironde. He joined Premier League club Bolton Wanderers from Bordeaux in July 2007, having spent 8 years with the French club. He left the club in mid-January 2008 by mutual consent and returned to France, joining Ligue 1 side Nice, on a three-and-a-half-year deal.

On 16 July 2010, Cid announced his retirement on the OGC Nice website.

Career statistics

References

External links
Bolton Wanderers Profile at Burnden Aces website

1983 births
Living people
People from Talence
Sportspeople from Gironde
French footballers
Association football defenders
FC Girondins de Bordeaux players
FC Istres players
Bolton Wanderers F.C. players
OGC Nice players
Ligue 1 players
Ligue 2 players
Premier League players
Expatriate footballers in England
French expatriate footballers
French expatriate sportspeople in England
Footballers from Nouvelle-Aquitaine